Lynn Minmay (Japanese: リン・ミンメイ Rin Minmei, Chinese: 鈴明美 / 林明美 Líng Míngměi / Lín Míngměi) is a fictional anime character from the Super Dimension Fortress Macross television series and Macross: Do You Remember Love? movie. She is also in Macross: Flash Back 2012 music video collection. The first Macross series and its Minmay character was adapted as the first part of the Robotech television series. Minmay is the embodiment of the music that plays a crucial role in setting Macross apart; as such, she has become the iconic character of that series.

In Macross (and Robotech), Minmay is a love interest of the main character Hikaru Ichijyo (Rick Hunter in Robotech) and becomes an idol singer and film star on board the spacecraft SDF-1 Macross. Her songs, which cause confusion amongst alien Zentradi soldiers, play a critical role in Space War I against Boddole Zer's Zentradi fleet.

The original Japanese Minmay is voiced by Mari Iijima, who also wrote some of the songs and sang for the series. She became a famous J-pop singer in part due to the success of the series. Iijima has also undertaken to reprise the role in the English dub of the series for ADV. This would be the second time that a key character in an anime series was voiced by the same voice actor in both Japanese and English.

Minmay is of Japanese and Chinese descent. Her father Lynn Paochun (鈴宝雄 Líng Bǎoxióng) is Chinese and her mother Shigeyo (しげよ) is Japanese. An English translation of the Chinese characters in Lynn Minmay's name is "bright and beautiful bell". The localizers of Macross in Chinese-speaking territories changed the character 鈴 (Líng, "bell") for her family name to 林 (Lín "grove"). To some extent, the morale raised by Lynn Minmay in Space War I is very reminiscent of Vera Lynn during the Second World War.

Background

Born in Yokohama Chinatown, Japan, Lynn Minmay moved in with her uncle Shaochin (少江) and aunt Feichun (慧中) on South Ataria Island in hopes of finding the path to fulfill her dream of becoming a star. On the day of the Zentradi invasion, she meets Hikaru and a series of events leads to her being swept off on the SDF-1 Macross along with the rest of the surviving population from that island. While on the space fortress, Minmay wins the Miss Macross beauty pageant and is propelled into celebrity.
 
When the Macross returns to Earth, she is the only civilian allowed off the space fortress. After her trip home in Japan (where her parents remained), Minmay returned to the fortress with her cousin Lynn Kaifun (and Hikaru's competition for her affection) in tow. Her beauty and singing talent also win over several Zentradi spies sent to explore human society, who spread their impressions among their fleetmates, thus unwittingly evoking peace-oriented attitudes among the alien aggressors. Ultimately, Minmay sings the songs that end the first war against the Zentradi.

During the second part of the series, the very fame and success she craved finally left her tired and virtually alone. She tries to run away from her celebrity status and start anew, with a more simple life alongside Hikaru, who is now more confused than ever in defining his feelings for Minmay and Misa Hayase; all of this while new conflicts arise between the human and Zentradi survivors of the first war. At the end of the series both Hikaru and Minmay realize they are very different people, and Minmay accepts that Hikaru belongs with Misa, remaining a friend to the couple afterwards.

In 2012, she embarks on the SDF-2 Megaroad-01 colony ship, which disappears 4 years later during its voyage towards the center of the Milky Way galaxy, becoming a legend in the Macross universe since then.

Additional notes on the character
Minmay's personality is that of any teenage girl, fun-loving, playful, full of dreams and hopes that she may realize some day. After their initial encounter during the start of the Space War I, Hikaru builds a deep infatuation on her that grows on and on throughout the series. But after Minmay wins the Miss Macross contest and becomes a distant pop idol, his feelings for her change, as she becomes too involved not only in the popular culture, but as a symbol of the human struggle against the Zentradi. Minmay also displayed insecurity and doubts about her attraction toward Hikaru and her cousin Lynn Kaifun.

In the film Macross: Do You Remember Love?, Minmay's portrayal was a bit different from the first Macross series. In the movie's story, she was already a popular singer and movie star, and she and Hikaru had never met before until the events that turn up on the movie. Hikaru is portrayed as a Valkyrie pilot who is a Minmay fan, and apparently falls for her after their meeting; Minmay, for her part, already tired of living in the eye of the media, initially befriends Hikaru after he saves her life, and she sees him as a friend from the outside of the crazy world of fame she has been living. As the plot evolves, she also begins to fall for him, yet it is too late, as Hikaru realizes he loves Misa, and his fascination for Minmay was just that and nothing more.

Her hit songs include "My Boyfriend's a Pilot," "Little White Dragon," and "Do You Remember Love?" The first song that Minmay sings, "Cinderella" in Episode 4, was not written for the show. Instead, the song had been written by Iijima prior to being picked for the role of Minmay. The fact that she was a songwriter was one of the factors that led to her being selected. Coincidentally, the very last song that Minmay would sing in a Macross animated production, "An Angel's Paints" (天使の絵の具 Tenshi no Enogu) from the Do You Remember Love? movie and Flash Back 2012 video, was also written by Iijima.

Macross creators Mikimoto Haruhiko and Kawamori Shoji have stated that Minmay's popularity in both sides of the war is partially inspired by the song Lili Marleen, a German love song which was popular on both sides during World War II.

Legacy

In the Macross world, Minmay continues to be remembered decades after Space War I. Her songs are constantly cherished and she will always be known as the girl who ended a war by singing. In every Macross sequel (even the non-canon Macross II OVA and movie), Minmay is referred to either indirectly (through references of her songs) or explicitly.

In Macross 7, she became an inspiration to Basara Nekki, who intends to win over his enemies with song. In Macross 7 Trash, there is a singing contest called "Voice Minmay 2046" to transform the winner in the new version of Minmay. Likewise, the winner and co-star of the story, Enika Chelini, is a fan of Minmay.  In Macross Frontier her song "My Boyfriend's a Pilot", sung by Ranka Lee during a Miss Macross Frontier competition, was referred to as "a legendary song every person here knows".  The final bars of "My Boyfriend's a Pilot" are heard in Macross Plus when Myung Fan Lone is taken by old schoolmates to a karaoke lounge.

Ranka Lee  can also be seen as the "new" Minmay. Both of them are playful, insecure, young teenage girls who pursue their singing dreams. Minmay and Ranka both have Chinese names and they both worked at the Nyan Nyan restaurant.
In the final episode of Macross Frontier, a picture of Minmay can be seen in a locket belonging to a Zentradi mogul called Richard Bilrer.

In Macross Delta it is said that inspired by the success of the "Lynn Minmay Attack," the mysterious "Lady M," who had a close connection with the Megaroad-01 ship that disappeared in 2016, had been sponsoring researches on songs and Protoculture and eventually created the ultimate songstress Mikumo. Speculations about the true identity of "Lady M" abound and "Lynn Minmay" is a popular guess. However, given the grand vision, political influence, and competence of Lady M in dealing with the New United Government and organizing the research, it is most likely that she was Misa Hayase, the captain of Megaroad-01, who deciphered the lyrics of the song "Do You Remember Love," or her daughter Miku Ichijo.

References

Works cited

External links
Official Macross website 
Lynn Minmay at the Macross Wiki

Television characters introduced in 1982
Fictional Chinese people
Fictional Japanese people in anime and manga
Macross characters
Fictional singers
Fictional actors
Female characters in anime and manga